Umeed is a Pakistani social soap opera television series, produced by Abdullah Kadwani and Asad Qureshi under their production banner 7th Sky Entertainment. It features Erum Akhtar, Kashif Mehmood, Farhan Ally Agha, Sara Saif and Sidra Batool as lead along with Sajid Shah, Asim Mehmood, Afshan Qureshi, Humaira Bano, Esha Noor and Farah Nadir in pivotal roles.

The serial marks comeback of Sidra Batool to television as she was last seen in Shikwa Nahin Kisi Se, three years back, in 2017.

Plot
Hailing from a lower middle-class family, Umeed is a young and innocent girl who shares a strong and loving bond with her mother, Zainab. Things come crashing down for the family when Saleem (Umeed's father) falls into the trap of stereotyping his own family due to financial hardships. With her marriage at stake and a daughter to take care of, Zainab stands up for herself and struggles to ward off the stigma around divorce. However, society's cruel remarks hold her back. The story follows struggle of Zainab and her daughter, Umeed as they face hardships in their lives.

Cast

Main
Erum Akhtar as Zainab 
Kashif Mehmood as Saleem Akram
Farhan Ally Agha as Yasir 
Sidra Batool as Umeed 
Sara Saif as Young Umeed
Humaira Bano as Tamanna Aapa, sister of Saleem
Asim Mehmood as Rameez

Recurring
Sajeer Uddin as Aftab, husband of Tamanna
Sajid Shah as Parvez, brother of Zainab 
Seema Khan as Naila, wife of Parvez 
Tasneem Ansari as Memoona Tariq, mother of Yasir.
Afshan Qureshi as mother of Naila
Saba Khan as Rabia, sister of Naila
Imran Patel as Amjad, elder son of Tamanna
Kausar Siddiqui as Shazia, Amjad's wife 
Zill E Huma as Shaheena, aka Guriya
Inayat Khan as Fawad
Syed Hamza as Jamal, second son of Tamanna
Owais Khan as Young Jamal
Hina Rizvi as Mrs Bilgrami, Fawad's mother
Hira Sheikh as Tehmina Begum, Rameez's mother 
Naeem Malik as Rabia's husband
Zahid Mehmood as Aleem
Esha Noor as Shela
Farah Nadir as Shela's mother
Khwaja Saleem as Shela's stepfather 
Tipu Sharif as Asad

Guest
Mehboob Sultan as Aijaz, a local bandit
Vasia Fatima as Surraiya, niece of Aftab
Faheem Tejani, Saleem's lawyer 
Anees Alam as Akhtar, senior employee of Yasir
Naeem Shaikh as Mr Jawad

References

External links
Umeed on official channel Page

2020 Pakistani television series debuts
Urdu-language television shows
Pakistani drama television series
Geo TV original programming
2020 Pakistani television series endings